Harikeshan Thampi, stage name Hari, is an Indian actor and dubbing artist best known for his work in Malayalam cinema. He has acted in more than 50 films and dubbed for almost 1,000 films.

Thampi made his debut in the Malayalam film Raja Harishchandra as Lohithakshan, son of Raja Harishchandra. Later he switched roles to be a dubbing artist. He lent his voice for Chiranjeevi in 60 films and all of them were super hits. Nagarjjuna, Krishna, and Mohan Babu were identified with his voice in Telugu. Ambareesh, Vishnuvarddan and Malayalam actors Sankar, Shanavas, Captain Raju, and Devan also benefited from the flexibility of his vocal cords.

Filmography

As an actor

 1954 Bhaalya Sakhi as child artist
Manthravadi (1956)
 Seetha (1960)
 Unniyarcha (1961)
 Bhakta Kuchela (1961) as Sukunan
 Krishna Kuchela (1961)
 Kadathukaran (1965) as Chandran
 Archana (1966) as Rajan's collegemate
 Station Master (1966)
 Pavappettaval (1967)
 Postman (1967)
 Mainatharuvi Kolakkes (1967)
 Sahadharmini (1967)
 Midumidukki (1968)
 Susy (1969)
 Sabarimala Sree Dharmashastha (1970)
 Panchavan Kaadu (1971)
 Sambhavaami Yuge Yuge (1972) as Policer Inspector
 Bhaarya Illaatha Raathri (1975)
 Chottaanikkara Amma (1976)
 Udyaanalakshmi (1976)
 Manimuzhakkam (1978) as Jose Paul
 Amba Ambika Ambaalika (1976)
 Sreemurukan (1977)
 Veerabhadran (1979)
 Puthiya Velicham (1979)
 Ambalavilakku (1980)
 Digvijayam (1980)
 Muthuchippikal (1980) as Raghu
 Vaadaka Veettile Athidhi (1981)
 Munnettam (1981) as Doctor
 Ammakkorumma (1981) as Varghese
 Chaappa (1982)
Panchajanyam (1982) as Raghu
 Gaanam (1982)
 Belt Mathai (1983) as Advocate
 Ee Yugam (1983)
 Kadamattathachan (1984) as Kunchavan Potti
  Krishna Guruvaayoorappa (1984) as Namboorishan
 Chorakku Chora (1985) as SP Subramaniyam
 Uyarthezhunelpu (1985)
 Madhuvidhu Theerum Munpe (1985)
 Naaradan Keralathil (1987)
 Ellaavarkkum Nanmakal  (1987)
 Inquilabinte Puthri (1988) as Velayudan
 Chaaravalayam (1988)
 Ancharakkulla Vandi (1989) as Raghavan
Eenam Thettatha Kattaru (1989) as Kattumooppan
Beauty Palace (1990)
 Thudarkadha (1991) as Police Inspector
 Aswathy (1991) as Usman
 Swaroopam(1992)
 Gandharvam (1993) as Advocate
 Hijack (1995) as I.G
 Kinavu Pole (2001)
 Malaramban (2001)
 Rasaleela
 Thalsamayam Oru Penkutty (2012)
 Vaidooryam (2013)

As a dubbing artist

References
http://www.malayalachalachithram.com/profiles.php?i=493

External links

Hari at MSI

Male actors in Malayalam cinema
Male actors from Kerala
Indian male film actors
Indian male voice actors
Living people
20th-century Indian male actors
21st-century Indian male actors
Year of birth missing (living people)